The Citroën G Van was the 1948 prototype built by Citroën of a small truck which looked like a scaled down version of the H Van, and equipped with an enlarged version of the 2CV flat twin enlarged to 475 cc. Front suspension was akin to that of the 2 CV but with twin suspension arms while the springing medium was by torsion bars front and rear.

It was never put into production, the decision was made to employ the 2 CV running gear instead in the AZU/AK series, which had a lower volumetric efficiency. One copy of the G Van has survived till today.

External links
Photos and diagrams of the G van

G Van
Cars powered by boxer engines